Shifa Thowfyq commonly spelled as Shifa Thaufeeq (11 July 1970) is a Maldivian singer and a recipient of five Gaumee Film Awards, three Aafathis Awards, one Maldives Film Award. She holds the record of maximum number of awards as a playback singer in Maldives.

Early life and career
Shifa Thaufeeq was born on 11 July 1970. She is the sister of notable local playback singers Sofa Thaufeeq and Asim Thaufeeq. Influenced by her brother and sister, Thaufeeq started singing at a very early age. In 1986, she initiated her career as a singer which resulted in her receiving several offers from music directors and producers to sing for their films and albums.

In an interview from Avas, Ahmed Hameed Adam commended her excellence for being relevant in the industry for more than three decades and praised her experience and quality. "The most awarded singer in the industry, Shifa is one of those few singers who still gets more offer than the current generation and can still sound young at this age". Ahmed Adhushan from Mihaaru placed her in the top five female vocalists of Maldives and noted that she holds the record of most awards for a singer and most recordings in the local industry.

Discography

Feature film

Short films

Television

Non-film songs

Accolades

References 

Living people
People from Malé
1970 births
Maldivian playback singers